Ben Purser (born 24 February 1990) is an Australian basketball player for the Perry Lakes Hawks of the NBL1 West. He debuted for the Hawks in 2008 and has helped them win two championships, the first in 2018 with grand final MVP honours, and the second in 2021. In the State Basketball League (SBL), he was named to the All-Star Five in 2018 and the All-Defensive Five every year between 2016 and 2019. He was also the league's Most Improved Player in 2009.

Between 2010 and 2013, Purser played a season of college basketball in the United States for Augusta State University and had a two-year stint with the Perth Wildcats of the National Basketball League (NBL) as a development player. He appeared in 24 NBL games between 2011 and 2013.

Early life and junior career
Purser attended Christ Church Grammar School in Perth, Western Australia, where he played basketball and football and served as School Captain. He graduated in 2007 and is now a member of the school's Old Boys' Association.

As a junior, Purser played for Subiaco Basketball Club and represented the Perry Lakes Hawks in the Western Australian Basketball League (WABL). He also represented Western Australia at three Australian Junior Championships, winning silver at the 2007 Under 18 National Championships in Launceston and bronze at the 2008 Under 20 National Championships in Albury. At the 2009 Under 20 National Championships in Townsville, WA finished fourth. In six games at the 2009 tournament, Purser averaged 13.5 points per game.

In June 2009, Purser represented Australia at the FIBA Oceania Basketball Tournament in Saipan. The chosen team was an Under 20s side and featured future NBA player Cameron Bairstow. The team went undefeated in the round robin and finals, going 6–0 to win the gold medal. A highlight for Purser was recording 13 points, 10 rebounds and six assists in a 107–41 win over CNMI on day 3.

SBL / NBL1 West career

Perry Lakes Hawks

SBL (2008–2020)
Purser made his debut for the Perry Lakes Hawks in the State Basketball League (SBL) in the 2008 season. The Hawks finished first in the regular season but lost to the Willetton Tigers in the quarter-finals. After averaging 7.3 points per game during the regular season, Purser scored 43 points over the three quarter-final games, including a 21-point effort in a 94–89 series-levelling win in game two. He appeared in 28 of the Hawks' 29 games, averaging 8.0 points, 4.8 rebounds and 1.3 assists in 20 minutes per game. Purser also played WABL during the 2008 season, earning Men's Division 1 All Star honours and leading the Hawks to victory in the Division 1 Grand Final.

The 2009 season saw Purser record a triple-double with 17 points, 11 rebounds and 12 assists against the Perth Redbacks on 4 April, and had a season-high 28 points against the Mandurah Magic on 16 May. He helped the Hawks reach the SBL Grand Final, where they were defeated 85–77 by the Lakeside Lightning. He had eight points, two assists, one rebound and one steal in the grand final. For the season, Purser won the SBL Most Improved Player Award. He appeared in 28 of the team's 31 games in 2009, averaging 13.4 points, 6.2 rebounds and 3.5 assists per game.

In 2010, Purser scored in double figures in all but one game, registering a season-high 28 points against the Cockburn Cougars on 20 March. The Hawks were defeated in the quarter-finals by the Geraldton Buccaneers. Purser appeared in 26 of the team's 28 games in 2010, averaging 17.8 points, 7.3 rebounds, 5.1 assists and 1.6 steals per game.

In 2011, Purser again scored in double figures in all but one game. On 6 June, he recorded 16 points, 21 rebounds and seven assists in a 94–85 win over the Goldfields Giants. He was subsequently named Player of the Week for Round 12. He later had back-to-back games with 28 points on 10 July and 16 July. The Hawks reached SBL Grand Final for the second time in three years, where they were defeated 88–83 by the Wanneroo Wolves despite 18 points from Purser. In 22 games, he averaged 18.2 points, 7.4 rebounds, 4.2 assists and 1.0 steals per game.

Purser was named team captain for the 2012 season. On 26 May, he scored 32 points in a 95–90 win over the Willetton Tigers. The Hawks missed the finals in 2012 for the first time since 1992, with Purser averaging 17.2 points, 9.0 rebounds, 4.8 assists and 1.6 steals in 19 games.

In 2013, Purser had three 30+ point games, including 34 points in a 104–97 win over the Perth Redbacks on 26 July. The Hawks returned to the semi-finals. He appeared in 29 of the Hawks' 31 games, averaging 17.6 points, 7.6 rebounds, 3.4 assists and 1.0 steals per game.

In 2014, Purser demonstrated all-rounder qualities as he took on much of the point guard duties. On 23 May, he recorded a triple-double with 28 points, 13 rebounds and 12 assists in a 138–134 double-overtime win over the Stirling Senators. On 21 June, he scored a season-high 31 points against the Joondalup Wolves. He scored in double figures in all but one game as the Hawks missed the finals. He appeared in all 26 games, averaging 20.8 points, 7.9 rebounds and 5.0 assists per game. At the season's end, Purser played for the North All-Stars in the first North v South SBL All-Star game in over a decade.

In 2015, Purser helped the Hawks return to the finals following a successful second half of the season where they won nine of their final 13 games. They lost in the quarter-finals to the Joondalup Wolves. On 4 July, in his 200th SBL game, Purser had 29 points, 14 rebounds, four assists and four steals in a 104–102 overtime win over the Goldfields Giants. He appeared in all 29 games, averaging 18.1 points, 9.4 rebounds and 4.3 assists per game.

In 2016, Purser participated in the SBL All-Star Game and was named in the inaugural SBL All-Defensive Five team. On 7 May, he scored a season-high 31 points in a 92–91 loss to the Willetton Tigers. In the Hawks' regular-season finale on 29 July, he recorded 24 points and 21 rebounds in a 102–96 win over the Kalamunda Eastern Suns. The Hawks lost in the quarter-finals to the Cockburn Cougars. Purser once again appeared in all 29 games, averaging 15.8 points, 9.0 rebounds, 4.6 assists and 1.0 steals per game.

In 2017, for the second year in a row, Purser participated in the SBL All-Star Game and earned SBL All-Defensive Five honours. A leader of his quality, character, production and work ethic impressed what was a new-look Hawks coaching staff. On 10 June, in his 250th SBL game, Purser scored a team-high 22 points in a 74–69 loss to the Goldfields Giants. On 8 July, he participated in the first ever SBL match played in Northam, recording 17 points and eight rebounds in the Hawks' 97–76 win over the Kalamunda Eastern Suns. The Hawks lost in the quarter-finals to the Willetton Tigers in the quarter-finals. In 27 games, Purser averaged 14.3 points, 8.0 rebounds and 4.0 assists per game.

In 2018, Purser was again at his best defensively and was able to play the majority of the time at small forward. The Hawks started the season with a 6–8 record, before going on a 12-game winning streak to finish in fourth place with an 18–8 record. He helped the Hawks reach the SBL Grand Final with a season-high 29 points during the semi-finals. In the grand final, Purser led the Hawks to a 94–87 victory over the Joondalup Wolves to win his first championship. He was named grand final MVP with 12 points, 10 rebounds and a game-high eight assists. To conclude the season, Purser was named in the All-Defensive Team for the third straight year and earned All-Star Five honours for the first time. He appeared in all 33 games, averaging 16.9 points, 8.3 rebounds and 5.6 assists per game.

In 2019, Purser was named in the All-Defensive Team for the fourth straight year and finished fourth in SBL MVP voting. He had a triple-double with 10 points, 10 rebounds and 11 assists against the Mandurah Magic on 5 April, and had a season-high 24 points against the East Perth Eagles on 30 June. In July, he became the all-time leader in games played for Hawks men with 318. The Hawks lost in the semi-finals to the Joondalup Wolves. He appeared in all 30 games, averaging 14.57 points, 7.5 rebounds and 5.63 assists per game.

With a cancelled 2020 SBL season due to the COVID-19 pandemic, Purser played for the Hawks in the West Coast Classic. He helped them reach the grand final, where they lost 96–81 to the Warwick Senators despite Purser's 24 points, nine assists, eight rebounds and two steals. He appeared in all 15 games, averaging 16.0 points, 6.0 rebounds and 4.6 assists per game.

NBL1 West (2021–present)

In January 2021, Purser re-signed with the Hawks for the inaugural NBL1 West season, with the SBL having been rebranded in October 2020. In the season opener on 17 April, he recorded 18 points, nine rebounds, seven assists and two steals in a 100–89 win over the Goldfields Giants. On 11 June, he scored a season-high 21 points against the Lakeside Lightning. Purser became the Hawks' overall games record holder in July 2021 when he played his 337th SBL/NBL1 game. He helped the Hawks finish the regular season as minor premiers with an 18–4 record. They went undefeated in the first two weekends of the finals to reach the NBL1 West Grand Final. In the grand final, Purser recorded 16 points, four rebounds and four assists in a 92–82 win over the Rockingham Flames to claim his second championship with the Hawks. In 21 games, he averaged 13.3 points, 5.3 rebounds, 5.0 assists and 1.4 steals per game.

In January 2022, Purser re-signed with the Hawks for the 2022 NBL1 West season. On 22 April, in his 350th SBL/NBL1 game, he recorded 23 points and 11 rebounds in an 80–68 loss to the Joondalup Wolves. He had another 23-point game against the Wolves on 10 June. In 23 games, he averaged 11.0 points, 6.0 rebounds and 4.9 assists per game.

In January 2023, Purser re-signed with the Hawks for the 2023 NBL1 West season.

College, NBL and 3x3

Augusta State (2010–2011)
In August 2010, Purser left Perth for a basketball scholarship at Augusta State University (ASU) in the United States. He transferred his two and a half years of Law/Commerce Studies at UWA to ASU, where he hoped to complete his studies while playing for the Jaguars men's basketball team in the NCAA Division II. He entered the 2010–11 season classed as a sophomore transfer, and quickly impressed Jaguars' head coach Dip Metress. Purser eased his way further into the line-up as the season progressed, and topped off the season with a career-high 21 points on 3 January 2011 against North Georgia. He shot 5 for 6 from the field and 9 for 10 from the line against North Georgia. ASU matched a school record with 30 wins in 2010–11 and made its fifth consecutive NCAA tournament appearance, hosting the Southeast Regional for the fifth straight season. The Jags claimed their fourth Peach Belt Conference (PBC) Championship in five years and won their second PBC tournament title in three years. Purser appeared in 34 games for the Jaguars in 2010–11, making 11 starts and averaging 7.7 points, 3.5 rebounds and 1.5 assists in 20.9 minutes per game.

While initially touted to return to Augusta State University for the 2011–12 season as late as 11 July 2011, Purser announced just three days later that he was likely staying in Perth due to academic reasons.

Perth Wildcats (2011–2013)
In early August 2011, Purser formally parted ways with Augusta State after joining a shortlist of players fighting for the final spot on the Perth Wildcats' NBL roster. On the shortlist included three members of the Wildcats' 2010–11 extended squad – Greg Hire, Tom Jervis and Everard Bartlett. Ultimately losing out to Hire, Purser was named a development player for the 2011–12 season. During the pre-season, the Wildcats travelled to Broome to compete in the Cable Beach Invitational Basketball tournament. While there, Purser played for Chinese team the Shanghai Sharks.

He appeared in 10 home games for the Wildcats during his first season, scoring a total of 20 points. Highlights for Purser included scoring 6 points in 5½ minutes against the New Zealand Breakers on 23 December 2011, and being nominated for the NBL's Round 23 Play of the Week for his athletic three-point play in the final period against the Cairns Taipans on 11 March 2012. He was subsequently nominated for the NBL Rookie of the Year Award, with the nomination list including himself, the eventual winner Anatoly Bose, and four others. The Wildcats finished the regular season in second place with a 19–9 record and defeated the third-seeded Gold Coast Blaze 2–1 in the semi-finals, with Purser seeing game time in game three on 7 April 2012. The Wildcats went on to face the New Zealand Breakers in the NBL Grand Final series, where they were defeated 2–1.

Purser received more opportunities during his second season with the Wildcats. He appeared in 14 games in 2012–13, with five of those coming on the road travelling as a member of the 10-man squad as an injury replacement. On 22 November 2012, he played in the Wildcats' first ever win at Perth Arena. For the second year in a row, the Wildcats finished the regular season in second place behind the Breakers, this time with a 22–6 record. The Wildcats swept the Wollongong Hawks 2–0 in their semi-final series, with Purser seeing 26 seconds in game one on 28 March 2013 in Perth. The Wildcats went on to face the Breakers in the NBL Grand Final series, where they were defeated 2–0. For the season, Purser totalled 11 points in 14 games.

On 8 September 2013, Purser represented the Wildcats for the final time, in the team's 2013–14 pre-season exhibition game against the SBL All-Stars.

3x3
In March 2018, Purser and his 3x3 team consisting of fellow SBL players won the NBL 3x3 Big Hustle WA. The following month, he helped the team reach the final of the NBL Pro Hustle in Melbourne, where they lost 21–15 to a team consisting of NBL veterans Peter Crawford, Jeremy Kendle and Anthony Petrie.

In January 2023, Purser and his 3x3 team consisting of past and present Perry Lakes Hawks players won the Perth Red Bull Half Court event.

Career statistics

Correct as of the end of the 2019 SBL season

SBL

|-
| style="text-align:left;"| 2008
| style="text-align:left;"| Perry Lakes
| 28 || || 20.0 || .457 || .167 || .697 || 4.8 || 1.3 || .5 || .1 || 8.0
|-
| style="text-align:left;"| 2009
| style="text-align:left;"| Perry Lakes
| 28 || || 33.4 || .436 || .333 || .707 || 6.2 || 3.5 || .8 || .4 || 13.4
|-
| style="text-align:left;"| 2010
| style="text-align:left;"| Perry Lakes
| 26 || || 39.2 || .462 || .309 || .731 || 7.3 || 5.1 || 1.6 || .2 || 17.8
|-
| style="text-align:left;"| 2011
| style="text-align:left;"| Perry Lakes
| 22 || || 40.9 || .433 || .234 || .726 || 7.4 || 4.2 || 1.0 || .4 || 18.2
|-
| style="text-align:left;"| 2012
| style="text-align:left;"| Perry Lakes
| 19 || || 39.5 || .378 || .328 || .708 || 9.0 || 4.8 || 1.6 || .3 || 17.2
|-
| style="text-align:left;"| 2013
| style="text-align:left;"| Perry Lakes
| 29 || || 39.2 || .492 || .258 || .647 || 7.6 || 3.4 || 1.0 || .1 || 17.6
|-
| style="text-align:left;"| 2014
| style="text-align:left;"| Perry Lakes
| 26 || || 41.0 || .478 || .273 || .725 || 7.9 || 5.0 || .7 || .4 || 20.8
|-
| style="text-align:left;"| 2015
| style="text-align:left;"| Perry Lakes
| 29 || || 40.1 || .450 || .265 || .655 || 9.4 || 4.3 || .9 || .7 || 18.1
|-
| style="text-align:left;"| 2016
| style="text-align:left;"| Perry Lakes
| 29 || || 40.6 || .405 || .297 || .748 || 9.0 || 4.6 || 1.0 || .3 || 15.8
|-
| style="text-align:left;"| 2017
| style="text-align:left;"| Perry Lakes
| 27 || || 33.7* || .432 || .242 || .684 || 8.0 || 4.0 || 1.2 || .3 || 14.3
|-
| style="text-align:left;background:#afe6ba;"|2018†
| style="text-align:left;"| Perry Lakes
| 33 || || 32.4* || .476 || .255 || .750 || 8.3 || 5.6 || 1.4 || .3 || 16.9
|-
| style="text-align:left;"| 2019
| style="text-align:left;"| Perry Lakes
| 30 || || 29.0* || .437 || .362 || .816 || 7.5 || 5.6 || 1.2 || .0 || 14.6
|-
| style="text-align:center;" colspan="2"|Career
| 326 || || 35.5 || .446 || .286 || .716 || 7.7 || 4.3 || 1.1 || .3 || 16.0

*SBL moved to 40-minute game (10-minute quarters) in 2017, shifting from 48-minute game (12-minute quarters).

College

|-
| style="text-align:left;"| 2010–11
| style="text-align:left;"| Augusta State
| 34 || 11 || 20.9 || .478 || .431 || .716 || 3.5 || 1.5 || .6 || .1 || 7.7

NBL

|-
| style="text-align:left;"| 2011–12
| style="text-align:left;"| Perth
| 10 || 0 || 4.3 || .467 || .000 || .857 || .6 || .5 || .0 || .0 || 2.0
|-
| style="text-align:left;"| 2012–13
| style="text-align:left;"| Perth
| 14 || 0 || 4.7 || .235 || .000 || .500 || .8 || .1 || .2 || .0 || .8
|-
| style="text-align:center;" colspan="2"|Career
| 24 || 0 || 4.5 || .344 || .000 || .692 || .7 || .3 || .1 || .0 || 1.3

Personal life
Purser's father, Andrew, is a former Australian rules footballer who played in the Victorian Football League (VFL) for the Footscray Football Club from 1983 to 1987.

In February 2015, Purser started working as a law graduate at law firm Steinepreis Paganin. He was admitted as a lawyer in December of that year before being made an associate in 2018.

References

External links

Augusta Jaguars college bio
Perry Lakes Hawks profile
NBL1 player profile
SBL stats 2009–2019
SBL stats 2009–2016

"Purser cashes in on chances" at thewest.com.au
"Ben Purser 300 Games" at hawksbasketball.com.au

1990 births
Living people
Augusta Jaguars men's basketball players
Australian men's basketball players
Australian expatriate basketball people in the United States
Basketball players from Perth, Western Australia
Forwards (basketball)
People educated at Christ Church Grammar School
Perth Wildcats players